Tony Cimellaro (born June 14, 1971) is a Canadian former professional ice hockey player who played two games in the National Hockey League for the Ottawa Senators during the 1992–93 NHL season.

Playing career
Cimellaro also played in various European leagues, beginning in 1993 with a spell in Serie A with Asiago followed by a season in the British National League for the Durham Wasps and the Blackburn Hawks.  He then moved to Denmark to play in the Oddset Ligaen for Vojens IK followed by two seasons in Germany, playing for the Ratingen Löwen in the Deutsche Eishockey Liga and Adendorfer EC of the German 1. Liga Nord before returning to North America.

Cimellaro spent two seasons in the Western Professional Hockey League with the Waco Wizards as a player/coach before finishing his career in the United Hockey League with the Adirondack IceHawks after the WPHL folded.  Since 2003 he has been the assistant coach of the Kingston Frontenacs in the Ontario Hockey League.he has taken an assistant coaching position with the AHL Belleville Senators.

Career statistics

Regular season and playoffs

Coaching career
From 2003 to 2010, he was an assistant coach with his former junior team, the Kingston Frontenacs in the Ontario Hockey League. He then was hired as an assistant coach with Queen's University Golden Gaels. In December 2017, he was brought in as a midseason replacement assistant coach with the Belleville Senators on the American Hockey League, but was not kept the following season.

References

External links

1971 births
Adendorfer EC players
Adirondack IceHawks players
Belleville Bulls players
Blackburn Hawks players
Canadian ice hockey centres
Canadian people of Italian descent
Durham Wasps players
EC Ratinger Löwen players
Asiago Hockey 1935 players
Ice hockey people from Ontario
Sportspeople from Kingston, Ontario
Kingston Frontenacs players
Kingston Raiders players
Living people
New Haven Senators players
North Bay Centennials players
Ottawa Senators players
Prince Edward Island Senators players
Undrafted National Hockey League players
Vojens IK players
Waco Wizards players
Canadian expatriate ice hockey players in England
Canadian expatriate ice hockey players in Denmark
Canadian expatriate ice hockey players in Italy
Canadian expatriate ice hockey players in Germany